The Fever is a 2019 internationally co-produced drama thriller film written and directed by Maya Da-Rin, Miguel Seabra Lopes and Pedro Cesarino and starring Regis Myrupu and Rosa Peixoto. Featuring dialogue in Portuguese and the indigenous languages Tukano and Tikuna, it features a main cast of indigenous Brazilian  from the Upper Rio Negro, belonging to the Desanos, Tucanos and Tarianas people, many of them whom had their first experience in cinema.

The film premiered at the international competition of the 72nd Locarno International Film Festival in Switzerland, where it received the Golden Leopard for Best Actor for Regis Myrupu, FIPRESCI  International Film Critics Award and the "Environment is Quality of Life" Prize from the young jury. Besides the award at the Locarno Festival, Regis Myrupu also received the Best Actor Award at the Brasilia Film Festival, becoming the first indigenous actor to be awarded at both festivals.

Plot 
The Fever tells the story of Justino (Regis Myrupu), a 45-year-old member of the indigenous Desana people, who emigrate to the city of Manaus leaving behind his village on the Upper Rio Negro region. Widowed, Justino works as a security guard at a cargo port, while his daughter Vanessa (Rosa Peixoto) takes several jobs as a nursing technician, and his eldest son lives in his own home with his wife and son. Caught up in the stream of a modest life, their routine comes down to the transit between their work and home, on the outskirts of Manaus.

When Vanessa hears that she has been approved to study medicine at the University of Brasília, her father's lack of ability to deal with the demands of urban life makes her question her decision to leave. At the same time, the visions that have been disturbing Justino in his dreams, start to manifest themselves in the form of a mysterious and intermittent fever, which coincides with rumors about the presence of a mysterious creature in the neighborhood.

In the port, his monotonous work routine is broken with the arrival of a new guard (Lourinelson Wladmir), with whom Justino has to deal with during the shift changes. Working before as a foreman of a cattle ranch in the countryside, Wanderlei does not hide his deep prejudice against native people. Meanwhile, the visit of his brother (Edmildo Vaz) and his sister-in-law (Anunciata Teles) makes Justino remember his village in the forest, from where he left twenty years ago.

Cast 

 Regis Myrupu as Justino
 Rosa Peixoto as Vanessa
 Johnatan Sodré as Everton
 Edmildo Vaz Pimentel as André
 Anunciata Teles Soares as Marta
 Kaisaro Jussara Brito as Jalmira
 Lourinelson Wladmir as Wanderlei
 Suzy Lopes as Rose

Production 
The Fever is an international co-production between Brazil (Tamanduá Vermelho and Enquadramento Produções), France (Still Moving) and Germany (Komplizen Film), produced by Maya Da-Rin, Leonardo Mecchi and Juliette Lepoudre and co-produced by Pierre Menahem, Janine Jackowski and Jonas Dornbach. The project was developed with the support of the Cinéfondation screenplay residency from the Cannes Film Festival and the TorinoFilmLab. It was shot in the city and metropolitan area of Manaus, Amazon, for seven and a half weeks, between the months of April and June 2018. Its cast and crew are mostly formed by local Amazonian people.

Release 
The Fever had its world premiere on August 8, 2019 at the opening of the official competition of the 72nd Locarno International Film Festival, in Switzerland, where it won three awards: the Golden Leopard for Best Actor for Regis Myrupu, the FIPRESCI International Film Critics Award and the Special Award “Environment is Quality of Life” granted by the young jury. The film was shown in more than sixty film festivals afterward, including Toronto International Film Festival, Rotterdam Film Festival and New Director New Films, having received more than thirty awards, including Best Film at the Pingyao International Film Festival (China), Biarritz Festival Latin America (France), IndieLisboa International Film Festival (Portugal), Mar del Plata International Film Festival (Argentina), Festival de Brasilia, and Best Direction at the Chicago International Film Festival (United States) and the Rio Film Festival (Brazil).

The film was released in Brazil by Vitrine Filmes on November 12, 2020, simultaneously on digital streaming platforms and physical cinemas, the latter of which reopened despite to the COVID-19 pandemic. Internationally, it is distributed by KimStim Films in North America, Survivance in France and New Wave Films in the United Kingdom.

The Fever has received positive reviews from Brazilian and foreign film critics. It was listed as the best debut film of 2019 in the critics' list “La internacional cinefilia" by programmer Nicole Brenez. The critic and programmer Diego Batlle gave 4.5 stars out of 5 in the electronic magazine Otroscines and wrote that The Fever “is one of the most convincing debut film in Latin American cinema in recent years”. Nicolás Quinteros, critic from Escribiendo Cine magazine, scored 8 and wrote that “it is an essential film to understand an important part of contemporary Latin American reality”. Francisco Russo, from the electronic magazine AdoroCinema, considered it “a film as rarely seen in Brazilian cinema” and Geraldo Couto from Outras Palavras said that the film is “a milestone” in the way indigenous characters are portrayed in movies. French critic Beatrice Loayza, from Cinema Scope magazine, considered the film “essential cinema, demanding empathy and understanding without pity or didacticism, and spotlighting indigenous people with the attention to cultural specifics that few films bother elaborating".

Prizes

References

External links
 A Febre at Tamanduá Vermelho's website
 A Febre at IMDb
 A Febre at AdoroCinema

2019 films
2019 thriller drama films
Films about dreams
Brazilian thriller drama films
French thriller drama films
German thriller drama films
2010s French films
2010s German films